Sandgerðisbær is a former Icelandic municipality located in southwestern Iceland on the Southern Peninsula. In 2018 it merged with Garður to create the new municipality of Suðurnesjabær. Sandgerði began to develop as a fishing village in the second half of the nineteenth century when motorboats took over the rowing boats. The land area of Sandgerðisbær is covers the entire western coast of Miðnes (Romshvalanes) north from Garðskagi to Ósabotnar in the south. Inland the land area of Sandgerðisbær stretches into the international airport at Keflavíkurflugvöllur with the air terminal within the municipal boundaries. Reynir football club play in Iceland's third tier and their basketball team by the same name competes in the 3rd tier of basketball in Iceland as well.
In Sandgerði, some noticeable enterprises have also developed into growing tourist industry.  One of the most interesting is the Sudurnes Science and Learning Center.  A museum and research center, dedicated to natural science and related subjects like water and animal life near the sea.

References

External links

Official site 
 More information and photos about Sandgerði on Hit Iceland

Municipalities of Iceland
Populated places in Southern Peninsula (Iceland)
Reykjanes
Populated places disestablished in 2018